Amiran Papinashvili (born 17 June 1988) is a Georgian judoka. He won gold medal in 2013 European Judo Championships, silver in 2014 European Judo Championships and bronze in 2012 European Judo Championships.

References

External links
 
 
 

1988 births
Living people
Male judoka from Georgia (country)
Judoka at the 2015 European Games
European Games medalists in judo
European Games silver medalists for Georgia (country)
European Games bronze medalists for Georgia (country)
Judoka at the 2016 Summer Olympics
Olympic judoka of Georgia (country)
Judoka at the 2019 European Games
21st-century people from Georgia (country)